En français... is a French-language studio album by Julio Iglesias, released in 2004 on Columbia (Sony).

Track listing

Charts

References 

2004 albums
Julio Iglesias albums
Columbia Records albums